Whenua Patuwai (born 13 March 1995) is a New Zealand singer. He is known for his appearance on the first New Zealand series of The X Factor where he was the runner-up. Competing in the Boys category, he was mentored by Ruby Frost.  His debut single "Something Special" was released in July 2013 and peaked at number three in the New Zealand singles chart. His debut album The Soul Sessions was released in June 2014 and debuted at number four in the album chart.

The X Factor 

Patuwai initially attended the Christchurch pre-audition in January 2013, where he was put through to the judges' auditions in Auckland. At his judges' audition, Patuwai performed the soul classic "A Change Is Gonna Come", eventually progressing to the top 13 in the live shows. In week eight, after a performance of "You Are Not Alone", Patuwai was in the bottom two with Cassie Henderson. The judges vote was deadlocked, with Patuwai saved by the public vote. During the final shows on 21 July, Patuwai duetted with Hollie Smith on the song "Bathe in the River". Patuwai voted was the series runner-up from the audience vote.

After The X Factor 

Whenua's single "Something Special" was released digitally on 26 July, with a CD release on 30 July. It debuted at number three in the Official New Zealand Music Chart. Patuwai later performed as the opening act for The X Factor judge Stan Walker on his World Tour of New Zealand tour in September and October 2013.

In June 2014 Patuwai released his debut album, The Soul Sessions, a selection of covers of soul classics. The album was produced by Sam De Jong, brother of Patuwai's The X Factor mentor Ruby Frost, and includes guest vocals from Ria Hall and Troy Kingi. The Soul Sessions debuted and peaked at number four in the New Zealand album charts.

In August 2014, Patuwai featured with other New Zealand artists on the charity single "A Song for Everyone".

Discography

Albums

Singles

As featured artist

References

External links 
 Whenua Patuwai at Facebook

The X Factor (New Zealand TV series) contestants
1995 births
Living people
21st-century New Zealand male singers
Sony Music New Zealand artists